Marjorie (Courtney) Quennell (1884–1972) was a British historian, illustrator and museum curator.

Her husband was architect Charles Henry Bourne Quennell (1872–1935).  They met at the Junior Art Workers Guild.  They had three children, including a son Peter Courtney Quennell (1905–1993) who became a well-known writer and was editor of History Today.

After World War I the Quennells wrote a series of illustrated children’s books, A History of Everyday Things in England, 4 volumes (1918–1934). The series ended with The Good New Days (1935), where modern industrial and agricultural processes, together with the problems of the future, were considered. A second series was written, Everyday Life in… (1921–26) describing living from Prehistoric to Norman times. A third series of Everyday Things (1929–32) covered Greece in antiquity. After World War II she illustrated two more books in the Everyday Life series on Biblical times, the texts being written by others. She was a painter in oils and watercolour, mostly of architectural subjects.

After her husband died in 1935 she was appointed curator of the Geffrye Museum. While there she installed the series of "period rooms" on which the museum is still based to this day. She remained there until she retired in 1940, then moved to the United States

Works
Author
Marjorie & C. H. B. Quennell, A History of Everyday Things in England, London, B. T. Batsford Ltd, 1918-1934
Volume I: 1066-1449
Volume II: 1500-1799
Volume III: 1733-1851
Volume IV: 1852-1914
Marjorie & C. H. B. Quennell, A History of Everyday Life in.., London, B. T. Batsford Ltd, 1921-1926.
Everyday life in Anglo-Saxon, Viking, and Norman times
Everyday Life in Roman Britain
Everyday Life in Prehistoric Times (vol. 1 The Old Stone Age, vol. 2 The New Stone Age)
Marjorie & C. H. B. Quennell, Everyday Things in Greece, London, B. T. Batsford Ltd, 1929-1932.
Volume 1: Homeric Greece
Volume 2: Archaic Greece
Volume 3: Classical Greece
Marjorie & C. H. B. Quennell, The Good New Days, London, B. T. Batsford Ltd., 1935.
Marjorie Quennell, London Craftsman: A Guide to Museums Having Relics of Old Trades, London, London Transport, 1939.

Illustrator
E. Lucia Turnbull and H. Dalway Turnbull, Through the Gates of Remembrance: First Series: A Trilogy of Plays Centred Round Glastonbury, London, T. Nelson & Sons, 1933.
Elisabeth Kyle, Disappearing Island, Boston, Houghton Mifflin Co., 1944.
Gertrude Hartman and Lucy S. Saunders, Builders of the Old World, Boston, D. C. Heath & Co., 1949. [Vol. 4 of the History on the March series]
A. C. Bouquet, Everyday Life in New Testament Times, London, B. T. Batsford Ltd, 1953.
Wallace Walter Atwood and Helen Goss Thomas, Visits in Other Lands, Toronto, Ginn, [1943].
E. W. Heaton, Everyday Life in Old Testament Times, London, Batsford Ltd, 1957.

References

Further reading
"C. H. B. & Marjorie Quennell", a biography by Tony Woolrich (archived link).

External links

Photo of  Marjorie Quennell showing schoolchildren her painted figures in one of the Geffrye Museum's period rooms, late 1930s
 Laura Carter, ‘Shall we judge him by his WORK?’: The Quennells and the primitive craftsman at Histories of Archaeology Research Network (HARN)

1884 births
1972 deaths
20th-century English historians
20th-century English women artists
20th-century English women writers
British women curators
British women historians
British women illustrators
People from Bromley